Road is a 2021 double-CD live album by the Fred Frith Trio, an experimental music and free improvising group featuring Fred Frith (guitar), Jason Hoopes (bass) and Jordan Glenn (drums). It is their third album and their first live release. The album was recorded in Charlottesville, Virginia and Germany in October 2019, and was released in October 2021 by Intakt Records in Switzerland.

Road also includes two guest musicians, Lotte Anker (saxophone) and Susana Santos Silva (trumpet). Anker and Santos Silva had previously performed with the trio on several occasions: Anker in New York and San Francisco, and Santos Silva in Brazil. Both had toured with the trio on the US East Coast and in Europe in 2019.

Reception

In a review of Road on the Best of Jazz website, Paul Medrano wrote that the album's first CD introduces the listener to the trio's music. It starts out with elements of jazz-rock sounding not unlike King Crimson and Frank Zappa, then progresses into experimental jazz and the group's "other dimension". Medrano said the inclusion of Anker and Santos Silva ("two extraordinary guests") on the second disc brings another layer of possibility to the trio's music, enhancing its "spirit, sound, and intention". Medrano called Road "an amazing album", which, despite being recorded live, is "purely electrifying".

Reviewing Road in the Swiss jazz and blues magazine, Ruedi Ankli called the trio's performance at the Week-End Fest in the Köln town hall, "breathtaking". He said their improvisation with snatches of melodies and rhythms that grow and collapse is "extraordinary". Ankli complimented Anker and Santos Silva's contributions to the concerts on the second disc. He said their saxophone and trumpet rhythms give the trio new ways to improvise. Ankli said both CDs are "refreshing" in their complexity and boldness.

Daniel Spicer wrote in the British monthly, Jazzwise, that, as on the group's two previous albums, Frith once again displays his "lateral thinking and restless creativity". Spicer said on the first CD, the trio "wanders unhurriedly from lumbering riffage to diaphanous soundscape", while on the second, guest Anker "slides from an assured, earthy tone to keening cry" and Santos Silva "unlocks a trove of extended techniques, from liquid ululations to blustery barrages". Spicer concluded that "It’s rare indeed that improvised music is simultaneously as accessible and cerebral as this."

Track listing

Sources: Intakt Records, Discogs.

Personnel
Fred Frith – electric guitar, voice
Jason Hoopes – electric bass
Jordan Glenn – drums

Guests
Lotte Anker – saxophones (CD 2, tracks 2, 3)
Susana Santos Silva – trumpet (CD 2, tracks 1, 4)

Sources: Intakt Records, Discogs.

Sound and artwork
CD 1 recorded at Week-End Fest, Stadthalle Köln, Germany, October 18, 2019
CD 2, tracks 1 and 4 recorded at Old Cabell Hall, University of Virginia, Charlottesville, Virginia, October 4, 2019
CD 2, tracks 2 and 3 recorded at Altes Kino, Ebersberg, Germany, October 31, 2019
Mixed and compiled at Guerrilla Recording, Oakland, California, May 12, 2021 
Mastered at Headless Buddha, Oakland, California, July 23, 2021
Myles Boisen – engineer
Fred Frith – producer
Intakt Records – producer
Heike Liss – photography, cover art
Fiona Ryan – graphic design

Sources: Intakt Records, Discogs.

References

External links
Road at Intakt Records
Road reviews at Intakt Records

2021 live albums
Intakt Records albums
Albums produced by Fred Frith
Fred Frith Trio albums